Bauhaus Strong Coffee is a coffee company based in Seattle, in the U.S. state of Washington.

Description 
Bauhaus has had used book sections. In addition to coffee drinks, the menu has included croissants, scones, and tea. The Ballard location has been described as an "art deco-inspired cafe".

History 
Known for its "strong coffee", the business was founded by Mark and Michael Klebeck on Capitol Hill in 1993. Bauhaus expanded to three locations, all of which closed in 2015 because of financial troubles for founder Joel Radin. The Ballard location reopened in 2016, and the business began operating on Capitol Hill again in 2019. The Ballard location closed in 2021.

Reception 
The Not for Tourists Guide to Seattle has said Bauhaus is "a little pretentious but so worth it". In 2019, Naomi Tomky included Bauhaus in Thrillist's overview of "Where to Find the Classic Coffee Shops That Made Seattle World Famous". The location on Pine was called "cool and classy".

References

External links 

 

1993 establishments in Washington (state)
American companies established in 1993
Capitol Hill, Seattle
Coffee in Seattle
Coffeehouses and cafés in Washington (state)
Restaurants in Seattle